Haddiscoe High Level was a railway station in Haddiscoe, Norfolk serving the now closed Yarmouth-Beccles Line. It obtained its name due to its close proximity to Haddiscoe railway station which served the Wherry Lines. The station was closed in 1959 at the same time as the line it served.

References

External links
 Haddiscoe High Level station on 1946 O. S. map

Disused railway stations in Norfolk
Former Great Eastern Railway stations
Railway stations in Great Britain opened in 1859
Railway stations in Great Britain closed in 1959
1859 establishments in England
1959 disestablishments in England